Skals is a town in Viborg Municipality, Denmark.
Skals International Efterskole is located in Skals.

References

Cities and towns in the Central Denmark Region
Viborg Municipality